Lio Lesong is a settlement in the Upper Baram region of Sarawak, Malaysia.

Neighbouring settlements include:

References

Populated places in Sarawak